Pontotoc is an unincorporated community in Johnston County, Oklahoma, United States. A post office was established in Pontotoc in 1858. The town was named after Pontotoc County, which was one of the divisions of the Chickasaw Nation.

Demographics

References

Unincorporated communities in Johnston County, Oklahoma
Unincorporated communities in Oklahoma